Punnarat Klinsukon, born February 12, 1981) is a Thai former footballer.

Honours

Thailand Premier League 2006 championship with Bangkok United

International career

Punnarat made his senior debut for the national team in a World Cup qualifying match home to Yemen, played at the Supachalasai Stadium. He was played two games for the national side.

External links

1981 births
Living people
Punnarat Klinsukon
Punnarat Klinsukon
Punnarat Klinsukon
Punnarat Klinsukon
Punnarat Klinsukon
Punnarat Klinsukon
Association football central defenders